Hisae Iwaoka (岩岡ヒサエ, born 17 July 1976, Chiba Prefecture) is a Japanese manga artist.

Career 
Iwaoka started her career as a professional manga artist in the early 2000s, when she released several short stories to critical acclaim. In 2002, she won the newcomers award  of the manga magazine Afternoon for "Yume no Soko". The short story was published in the October 2002 issue of Afternoon and became her debut. In 2004, she won the alternative manga magazine Ikki's newcomer award Ikiman for "Shiroi Kumo". Two of her short story collections were jury-recommended works at the Japan Media Arts Festival; Shiroi Kumo in 2005 and Yume no Soko in 2006.

Some of her work was included in the 2004 Takashi Murakami exhibition "Tokyo Girls Bravo" at the Marianne Boesky Gallery, where her artwork was compared to that of A. A. Milne.

Eventually, from 2004 on she focused on series, publishing in magazines for different demographics such as seinen, shōjo and josei. Hoshigahara Aomanjū no Mori was a jury-recommended work at the 2010 Japan Media Arts Festival. And the science fiction series Saturn Apartments, published in Ikki and licensed in English by Viz Media, won the festival's Grand Prize in 2011, making her the third female artist after Makoto Isshiki and Fumiyo Kōno to win the award. The jury called the manga a "gentle human drama set in the near-future earth". Her ongoing series Koshoku Robot has been made into live-action series.

Aside from her publications as a professional manga artist, she is also active in amateur manga. In 2009, she formed a doujinshi circle named "Harapeko Sentai Hashi Ranger" together with fellow manga artists Takako Shimura, Fumiko Tanagawa, Aoki Toshinao and Ishide Den.

Works

References

External links
moimoi (official website) 

Manga artists from Chiba Prefecture
Living people
1976 births
Joshibi University of Art and Design alumni